The Saigon Paragon is a shopping centre and office building in Ho Chi Minh City, Vietnam. It is located at 3 Nguyen Luong Bang Street, Tan Phu Ward, District 7, in the newly established Phu My Hung area. It was originally established through a collaboration between two corporations, Khaisilk and Thuy Loc. The lower floors (1 through 4) are home to various luxury retail stores, while the upper floors (6 through 9) are used for office space. A food court and supermarket are located in the basement, and a Cineplex theatre is located on the 5th floor.

Notes and references

External links
 Saigon Paragon

Economy of Ho Chi Minh City
Shopping malls established in 2009